Microcarina surgerea is a species of sea snail, a marine gastropod mollusk, unassigned in the superfamily Seguenzioidea, the turban snails.

Description
The shell grows to a length of 1 mm.

Distribution
This marine species occurs off Australia, from New South Wales to Victoria.

References

External links
 To World Register of Marine Species
 

surgerea
Gastropods described in 1954